Aramazd was the chief and creator god in the Armenian version of Zoroastrianism. The deity and his name were derived from the deity Ahura Mazda after the Median conquest of Armenia in the 6th century BC. Aramazd was regarded as a generous god of fertility, rain, and abundance, as well as the father of the other gods, including Anahit, Mihr, and Nane. Like Ahura Mazda, Aramazd was seen as the father of the other gods, rarely with a wife, though sometimes husband to Anahit or Spandaramet. Aramazd was the Parthian form of Ahura Mazda.

Name 
The merging of the two words of Ahura Mazda first appears in the Old Persian section of the Behistun Inscription, carved by the Achaemenid King of Kings Darius the Great, who refers to the deity as Auramazdāha. Avestan documents continued to spell the name with two words, a form which may have been accepted in Armenia. Aramazd is the Parthian form of Ahura Mazda.

History 
Aramazd, Mihr, Anahit, Vahagn and Tir were the dominant deities of the Armenian pantheon. Later attempts were made to reform the pantheon, including possibly reducing it to comprise three leading deities instead: Aramazd, Anahit and Vahagn. The main sanctuary of Aramazd was located in Kamax in northern Armenia. Another sanctuary of Aramazd was located in Bagavan, which was near the seat of power in the Ararat Plain. In Zoroastrianism, Ahura Mazda is considered the creator of wealth, and thus Armenians admired Aramazd as the giver of parart-utiwn (a loanword from Iranian, meaning "fatness, abundance"). One of the features of Parthian Zoroastrianism was that they had cult statues of the gods, which the Armenians imitated. Aramazd was associated with the Greek god Zeus.

Identification with other deities 
Aramazd was readily identified with Zeus through interpretatio Graeca, the two often sharing specific titles regarding greatness, bravery, or strength.  There was some disagreement in scholarship as to the relationship between Aramazd, Amanor, and Vanatur, but the evidence most strongly indicates that Vanatur ("Lord of the Van") was a title for the chief deity (be it Ḫaldi or Ahura Mazda/Aramazd, though recorded uses are only as a title for Aramazd), and that Amanor was both a common noun referring the new year and a title for the deity whose celebration was held on the new year (Vanatur, whether Ḫaldi or Aramazd).

See also 
Astghik
Hayk
Vahagn

References

Sources 
 
 
 
 
 
 
 
 
 
 
 

Abundance gods
Armenian gods
Creator gods
Fertility gods
Rain deities